Launy Grøndahl (30 June 1886 – 21 January 1960) was a Danish composer and conductor. Grøndahl studied the violin from the age of eight. His first work as a professional musician was as a violinist with the Orchestra of the Casino Theatre in Copenhagen, aged thirteen.

He was also for a long period (1925–1956) the resident conductor of the Danish National Symphony Orchestra, Denmark's most prestigious orchestra. Launy Valdemar Grondahl is known to posterity for two things – his distinguished 31 – year conducting career with the Danish National Radio Symphony Orquestra, and his Trombone Concerto dating form 1924.

Launy Grøndahl was born in Denmark on June 30, 1886, dying in 1960, he began his studies with Anton Bloch, Ludolf Nielsen and Axel Gade, and what marks his life as a violinist and composer was a scholarship from the Kobenhavns Orkestreforenings Jubioeumslegat (granting of the Jubilee of the Copenhagen Orchestral Association) in the summer of 1924. This thanks to the manager of the Vacuum Oil Company, Carls A. Muchaelsen, had donated kr. 2500 to honor a talented member in connection with the association's 25th anniversary jubilee on 25 April 1924. With this Grøndahl scholarship you can tour Europe in search of musical knowledge and maturation in Paris, Vienna and Milan, among other cities.

Notable works
Some of his first works included a symphony, works for small string ensembles and a violin concerto.

He is best known for his trombone concerto, written in 1924 during Grøndahl's time in Italy. It was reportedly written for the trombone section of the Orchestra of the Casino Theatre in Copenhagen (of which Grøndahl was a member) due to their high standard of playing.

He is also remembered for his pioneering recordings of the symphonies of fellow Dane Carl Nielsen and his original score for Benjamin Christensen's classic silent film Häxan.

References

External links
 Biography (in Spanish)

1886 births
1960 deaths
Danish composers
Male composers
Danish conductors (music)
Male conductors (music)
Musicians from Copenhagen
20th-century conductors (music)
20th-century Danish male musicians